It's Alright Between Us as It Is is the fourth studio album by Norwegian electronic musician Hans-Peter Lindstrøm. It was released on 20 October 2017 through Smalltown Supersound.

Track listing

References

2017 albums
Hans-Peter Lindstrøm albums
Smalltown Supersound albums